Wentzville R-IV School District is a school district headquartered in Wentzville, Missouri, United States. In addition to almost all of Wentzville, the district serves all of Lake St. Louis, the St. Charles County portion of Foristell; and portions of Dardenne Prairie, Flint Hill, Josephville, and O'Fallon.

History
In 2022 the American Civil Liberties Union (ACLU) sued the district over the district's plan to no longer include eight books in the school's library. The school board had voted to remove The Bluest Eye by Toni Morrison with four in favor and three against. By February 2022 the board reversed its decision on The Bluest Eye.

Schools

High schools
Wentzville Holt High School
Timberland High School 
Liberty High School
North Point High School

Middle schools
Frontier Middle
South Middle
Wentzville Middle
North Point Middle

Elementary schools
Boone Trail Elementary
Crossroads Elementary
Discovery Ridge Elementary
Duello Elementary
Green Tree Elementary
Heritage Intermediate 3-6
Heritage Primary K-2
Journey Elementary
Lakeview Elementary
Peine Ridge Elementary
Prairie View Elementary
Stone Creek Elementary
Wabash Elementary

Early Childhood
 Barfield Early Childhood Center

In early 2016, the district announced that during the 2017–18 school year they would move all 6th grade students from the middle schools to their respective elementary schools. This allowed more space for the Middle Schools to expand and be able to teach more subjects with more space and a smaller teacher to student ratio.

References

External links

School districts in Missouri
Education in St. Charles County, Missouri